David Dixie Adams (born 5 January 1970) is a former tennis player from South Africa. He turned professional in 1989. In his career, he won 19 doubles titles and finished runner-up an additional 33 times, including at the French Open in 1992. He achieved a career-high doubles ranking of world No. 9 in February 1994.

Adams participated in six Davis Cup ties for South Africa between 1997 and 2003, posting a 4–2 record, all in doubles.

Adams won two Grand Slam titles in mixed doubles, both with fellow South African Mariaan de Swardt, taking the Australian Open title in 1999 and the French Open title in 2000.

Grand Slam finals

Mixed doubles: 2 (2 titles)

Career finals

Doubles: 52 (19 titles, 33 runner-ups)

Doubles performance timeline

References

External links
 
 
 

South African people of British descent
Sportspeople from Durban
South African male tennis players
1970 births
Living people
Tennis players at the 2000 Summer Olympics
Grand Slam (tennis) champions in mixed doubles
Australian Open (tennis) champions
French Open champions
White South African people
Olympic tennis players of South Africa